Pseudochromis flavopunctatus the yellow-spotted dottyback, is a species of ray-finned fish from the Western Central Pacific Ocean, which is a member of the family Pseudochromidae.

References

flavopunctatus
Taxa named by Anthony C. Gill
Taxa named by John Ernest Randall
Fish described in 1998